Konjanik is a 2003 Croatian film directed by Branko Ivanda. It is based on Ivan Aralica's 1971 novel of the same name.

The movie takes place in the early 18th century on the borders between the regions of Bosnia and Dalmatia, the crossroads of the Ottoman Empire and the Republic of Venice. It deals with issues relating to the region's native Croats as they struggle to live between two empires and two faiths: Catholicism and Islam. The film's main character Petar Revač, was played by Nikša Kušelj.

Cast
Nikša Kušelj - Petar Revač
Zrinka Cvitešić - Lejla
Goran Grgić - Andrija
Mladen Vulić - Mujaga Lalić
Borko Perić - Ivan Revač - Nikodim
Božidar Orešković - Zapovjednik
Dejan Aćimović - Begović
Gordana Gadžić - Begovića
Dragan Despot - Veliki
Danko Ljuština – Džafer-beg
Zijah Sokolović – Luda

References

External links

2003 films
2003 drama films
Films set in the 18th century
Films set in Croatia
Films set in the Ottoman Empire
Croatian drama films
Films based on Croatian novels